This is a list of Hungarian architects.

18th century

 József Jung (1734–1808)

19th century

 Emil Ágoston (1876–1921)
 Ignác Alpár (1855–1928)
 Aladár Árkay (1868–1932)
 Lipót Baumhorn (1860–1932)
 Győző Czigler (1850–1905)
 Frigyes Feszl (1821–1884)
 Alajos Hauszmann (1847–1926)

 József Hild (1789–1867)
 István Kiss (1857–1902)
 Flóris Korb (1860–1930)
 Béla Lajta (1873–1920)
 Adolf Lang (1848–1913)
 Géza Maróti (1875–1941)
 Gyula Pártos (1845–1916)
 Samu Pecz (1854–1922)
 Ferenc Pfaff (1851–1913)
 Mihály Pollack (1773–1855)
 Zsigmond Quittner (1859–1918)
 Ferenc Reitter (1813–1874)
 Gyula Rochlitz (1825–1886)
 Albert Schickedanz (1846–1915)
 Frigyes Schulek (1841–1919)
 Imre Steindl (1839–1902)
 Miklós Ybl (1814–1891)

Secession (early 20th century)

 Károly Kós (1883–1977)
 Béla Lajta (1873–1920)
 Ödön Lechner (1845–1914)
 Ede Magyar (1877–1912)

 István Medgyaszay (1877–1959)

20th century

 Ferenc Bán (born 1940)
 István Beöthy (1897–1961)
 Marcel Breuer (1902–1981)
 László Csaba (1924–1995)
 Ákos Eleőd (born 1961)

 László Földes (born 1959)
 Ernő Goldfinger (1902–1987)
 Dénes Györgyi (1886–1961)
 Alfréd Hajós (1878–1955)
 László Hudec (1893–1958)
 Oskar Kaufmann (1873–1956)
 Paul László (1900–1993)
 Dezső Lauber (1879–1966)

 Imre Makovecz (1935–2011)

 Gábor Preisich (1909–1998)
 László Rajk Jr. (1949–2019)
 Gyula Rimanóczy (1903–1958)
 Ernő Rubik (born 1944)
 Eva Vecsei (born 1930)
 Roland Wank (1898–1970)

See also

 List of architects
 List of Hungarians

Hungarian
Architects